The Gârliște is a left tributary of the river Caraș (Karaš) in Romania. It discharges into the Caraș near the village Gârliște.

References

Rivers of Romania
Rivers of Caraș-Severin County